Lantana involucrata, commonly known as buttonsage, is a species of flowering plant in the verbena family. It is native to the American tropics, where it is widespread in well-drained areas. It is also found on the Galapagos Islands and Bermuda.

Etymology
The name Lantana derives from the Latin name of the wayfaring tree Viburnum lantana, the flowers of which superficially resemble Lantana.

References

involucrata